Francesco Musotto (born 1 February 1947 in Palermo) was an Italian politician and Member of the European Parliament for the Islands (elected for the first time in 1999). He is the son of Giovanni Musotto, a notable professor in criminal law at the University of Palermo and member Italian Socialist Party (Italian: Partito Socialista Italiano, PSI).

Francesco Musotto, a former member of the PSI like his father, is currently with Forza Italia (part of the European People's Party), sits on the European Parliament's Committee on Regional Development, is a substitute for the Committee on Fisheries, and of the Committee on Transport and Tourism. He was President of the Province of Palermo from 1994 to 1995 and from 1998 to 2008.

Career
He graduated in law in 1969, worked as a lawyer from 1974, and as a farmer from 1996. Musotto earned a second diploma in agriculture in 1998.

Between 1972 and 1975, he served as Municipal Councillor for Cefalù, and is Chairman of the Palermo Provincial Council since 1998. He was a member of the Sicilian Regional Assembly in 1983–1986.

External links
 European Parliament biography of Francesco Musotto (incl. Speeches, Questions and Motions)

See also
2004 European Parliament election in Italy

References

Jamieson, Alison (2000). The Antimafia: Italy’s fight against organized crime, London: Macmillan, .

1947 births
Living people
Italian Socialist Party politicians
Politicians from Palermo
Presidents of the Province of Palermo
Forza Italia MEPs
MEPs for Italy 2004–2009
MEPs for Italy 1999–2004
Italian Socialist Party MEPs
Academic staff of the University of Palermo